The NS 3900 was a series of express steam locomotives of the Dutch Railways.

History

At the end of the 1920s, the Dutch Railways needed an express locomotive that was stronger than the 3700 series, because more and more wooden passenger coaches were replaced by steel ones. The axle load could also could be increased from 16 tons to 18 tons. This resulted in a design that looked at both NS 3600 and NS 3700 series, so with a wheel arrangement of 2'C. The NS 3900 series used bar frame of the 3600 but the design of boiler, cylinders and cab resembled the 3700 series, but with a more powerful boiler and cylinders with a diameter of 420 mm instead of 400 mm. This increased tractive effort by about 15 percent. The same boiler would later be used on the 6300 series of tank engines. The tender was similar to that of the NS 3600 series and the later built eight wheeled tenders of the series 3700 series. The NS 3900 was able to quickly bring the heaviest passenger trains to a speed of 100 km/h (62 mph).

The manufacturer, Henschel & Sohn, built the locomotives in two batches in 1929 and 1930. The first batch of 22 locomotives from 1929 (3901-3922) was initially not built with smoke deflectors. These were installed in 1930. The second batch of ten locomotives (3923-3932) was fitted with smoke deflectors immediately upon completion.

Until the electrification, they pulled the heaviest express and D trains, but there were also disadvantages. Especially the fireman had a hard time on a 3900 or 6300. They could hardly be fired by hand and the power out of 1,600 kgf was only achieved with the best coal and a good fireman. The locomotives were also technically unsuccessful. The boiler design was old-fashioned and the construction of the cylinders and valves was also of an outdated design. The build quality also left much to be desired, which resulted in cracking inner fireboxes and disproportionate wear of various sliding bearings of the cylinder block.

Almost immediately after they were put into service, controversy arose about the quality of the 3900s. This was confirmed because, apart from the coal consumption, the series 6300 showed none of the above deficiencies. Due to the findings of various committees, adjustments were made to the locomotive's construction, which largely solved the problems. The poor steaming of the series, however, persisted until the withdrawal, despite several tests. This was partly due to the construction of the cylinder blocks, where large-scale modifications often meant a completely new cylinder block. Due to the high costs, this was not done with the 3900 series.

When problems with the new diesel-three trainsets on the central network, which had to provide fast connections between the major cities, were replaced by so-called steam diesels services, short express trains pulled by a steam locomotive, which had to be able to keep up with the timetabel of the diesel multiple units. Before that, test runs were first held with locomotives of the 2100, 3700 and 3900 series. It turned out that both the 2100 and the 3700 were faster than the 3900. This was due to the fact that the 3900 had a high rolling resistance of its own, which made it type was less suitable for light express trains.

After the Second World War, they used the 3900 was less and less, except for a single express or D train. Not a single engine has survived into preservation, but the preserved NS 6317 does have the boiler of NS 3927.

The NS 3900 was the last express steam locomotive specially designed for the Netherlands, although the NS 4000 series was ordered in Sweden during the war, however this series was intended to quickly help to restart the destroyed the railway.

Gallery

Sources 

 Martin van Oostrom: Stoomlocomotieven serie NS 6300, uitgeverij Stichting Railpublicaties Rosmalen, 1985. .

Steam locomotives of the Netherlands
Henschel locomotives
4-6-0 locomotives
Rolling stock of the Netherlands